Richard Stuppeny (by 1487 – 1540), of New Romney, Kent, was an English politician.

He was a Member of Parliament (MP) for New Romney in 1515. He was also jurat, chamberlain, and commissioner of subsidy in the town and was bailiff to Yarmouth.

References

15th-century births
1540 deaths
Members of Parliament for New Romney
English MPs 1515
Bailiffs
Chamberlains
Jurats